"The Longest Time" is a doo-wop song by Billy Joel, released in 1984 as the fourth single from the 1983 album An Innocent Man. Following the theme of the album in paying tribute to Joel's musical influences, the song is presented in the style of Frankie Lymon and the Teenagers. It reached number 14 on the Billboard Hot 100 and number 1 on Billboards Adult Contemporary chart. In the United Kingdom the song reached number 25 on the UK Singles Chart.

The song features Joel on lead vocals, all backing vocals, and percussive sounds such as finger snaps and hand claps. The only other instruments in the song are a bass guitar and a snare drum being played with brushes. When the song is covered by vocal groups, the bass part is typically sung. Phil Ramone and Joel had intended to feature a vocal group, but Joel recorded each of the parts himself.

Background
TBA

Composition
The song composed in a key of E-flat major.

Music video 
The music video starts with a man (played by Joel) in a gym after his 25th high school reunion party. Looking around at posters of several class awards, he breaks into song as his band, apparently portrayed as his high school friends, enters the gym. As they sing, they alternate between their high school and current selves, ending with their high school selves walking out of the restroom and interacting with a puzzled janitor. The video was entirely filmed at Pratt Institute in Brooklyn and was directed by Jay Dubin.

Chart performance

Certifications

References

External links 
 

1983 songs
1984 singles
Billy Joel songs
Columbia Records singles
Doo-wop songs
Song recordings produced by Phil Ramone
Songs written by Billy Joel